Ángel Enrique Pután Sandoval (born June 20, 1986) is an Ecuadorian footballer currently playing for UTC.

External links
Pután's FEF player card 

1986 births
Living people
People from Machala
Association football forwards
Ecuadorian footballers
L.D.U. Quito footballers
L.D.U. Loja footballers
C.D. Olmedo footballers
C.D. Técnico Universitario footballers
Guayaquil City F.C. footballers
Fuerza Amarilla S.C. footballers
C.S.D. Macará footballers
Manta F.C. footballers